The Most Distinguished Family Order of Terengganu (Bahasa Melayu: Darjah Kebesaran Kerabat Terengganu Yang Amat Mulia) is an honorific order of the Sultanate of Terengganu.

History 
It was founded by Sultan Ismail Nasiruddin of Terengganu on 19 June 1962 as a family order for members of the Terengganu and other Royal houses.

Classes 
It is awarded in two class:  
 Member of the first class or Ahli Yang Pertama (Max. 16 recipients at any one time) - D.K. I
 Member of the second class or Ahli Yang Kedua (Max. 24 recipients) - D.K. II

Recipients
 Vajiralongkorn
 Abdul Halim of Kedah
 Abdullah of Pahang
 Ahmad Shah of Pahang
 Azlan Shah of Perak
 Ibrahim Ismail of Johor
 Iskandar of Johor
 Ja'afar of Negeri Sembilan
 Mahmud of Terengganu
 Mizan Zainal Abidin of Terengganu
 Muhriz of Negeri Sembilan
 Munawir of Negeri Sembilan
 Sharafuddin of Selangor
 Sirajuddin of Perlis
 Tunku Abdul Malik
 Tunku Abdul Rahman
 Hussein Onn
 Yahya Petra of Kelantan
 Ismail Petra of Kelantan
 Muhammad V of Kelantan
 Tengku Intan Zaharah
 Sultanah Nur Zahirah

References 

Family Order